Tripura Industrial Development Corporation or TIDC is a state Industrial Development Corporation in the state of Tripura, India.

History
The Tripura Industrial Development Corporation Limited (TIDC) was established in 1974 as a Private Limited Company under the company's act 1956. On top of that, provisions of State Financial Corporations Act 1951 have been extended to TIDC as well. This leads to TIDC performing the twin role of the State Industrial Development Corporation and State Financial Corporation. TIDC is a profit making PSU.

External links
 tidc.co.in

Economy of Tripura
State industrial development corporations of India
State agencies of Tripura
1974 establishments in Tripura
Government agencies established in 1974